Canyon Springs High School is a public high school in North Las Vegas, Nevada and is part of the Clark County School District.  Canyon Springs is also home to the Leadership and Law Preparatory Academy and was one of three (including Del Sol High School and Spring Valley High School) schools opened by the  district in 2004.

Leadership and Law Preparatory Academy 
Canyon Springs High School houses the Leadership and Law Preparatory Academy, a college preparatory magnet program that made Canyon Springs the second school in the Clark County School District (aside from the Advanced Technologies Academy) to offer a four-year program in legal studies.  The campus includes a fully functioning courtroom.

Magnet Schools of America has named the Leadership and Law Preparatory Academy a magnet school of excellence for the 2014-2015 and 2015-2016 school years.

Magnet students use Microsoft Office applications to create projects using multimedia content. Magnet classes have Apple MacBook Air computers to work on their projects.

Extracurricular activities

Athletics 
The athletic teams at Canyon Springs are known as the Pioneers and compete in the Northeast Division of the Sunrise 4A Region.

Nevada 4A Titles 
Basketball (Boys) - 2011

Notable alumni
 Juron Criner,  Ottawa Redblacks wide receiver 
 Donnel Pumphrey, Philadelphia Eagles, Running Back

References

External links 

Clark County School District homepage

Clark County School District
Educational institutions established in 2004
High schools in Clark County, Nevada
School buildings completed in 2004
Public high schools in Nevada
Magnet schools in Nevada
2004 establishments in Nevada